The Kaushitaki Upanishad is an ancient Sanskrit text contained inside the Rigveda. It is associated with  the Kaushitaki shakha, but a Sāmānya Upanishad, meaning that it is "common" to all schools of Vedanta. It was included in Robert Hume's list of 13 Principal Upanishads, and lists as number 25 in the Muktika canon of 108 Upanishads.

The Kaushitaki Upanishad, also known as Kaushitaki Brahmana Upanishad, is part of the Kaushitaki Aranyaka or the Shankhayana Aranyaka. The Kausitaki Aranyaka comprises 15 chapters and four of these chapters form the Kaushitaki Upanishad.

Chronology
The chronology of Kaushitaki Upanishad, like other Upanishads, is unclear. It is based on an analysis of archaism, style and repetitions across texts, driven by assumptions about likely evolution of ideas, and on presumptions about which philosophy might have influenced which other Indian philosophies.

Kaushitaki Upanishad was probably composed before the middle of the 1st millennium BCE. Ranade places Kaushitaki chronological composition in the third group of ancient Upanishads, composed about the time of Aitareya and Taittiriya Upanishads. Juan Mascaró posits that Kaushitaki Upanishad was probably composed after Brihadaranyaka, Chandogya and Taittiriya Upanishads, but before all other ancient Principal Upanishads of Hinduism. Deussen as well as Winternitz consider the Kaushitaki Upanishad as amongst the most ancient prose style Upanishads, and pre-Buddhist, pre-Jaina literature.

Ian Whicher dates Kaushitaki Upanishad to about 800 BCE. According to a 1998 review by Patrick Olivelle, and other scholars, the Kaushitaki Upanishad was likely composed in a pre-Buddhist period, but after the more ancient Brihadaranyaka and Chandogya Upanishads, placing the Kaushitaki text between 6th to 5th century BCE.

Structure
The Kaushitaki Upanishad is part of the Rig veda, but it occupies different chapter numbers in the Veda manuscripts discovered in different parts of India. Three sequences are most common: the Upanishad is chapters 1, 2, 3 and 4 of Kausitaki Aranyaka, or 6, 7, 8, 9 chapters of that Aranyaka, or chapters 1, 7, 8 and 9 in some manuscripts. Paul Deussen suggests that these different chapter numbers may reflect that Upanishadic layer of Vedic literature were created and incorporated as spiritual knowledge in the pre-existing Aranyaka-layer of Vedic texts, and when this was being done in distant parts of India, the sequencing information was not implemented uniformly.

The Kausitaki Upanishad is a prose text, divided into four chapters, containing 6, 15, 9 and 20 verses respectively.

There is some evidence that the Kaushitaki Upanishad, in some manuscripts, had nine chapters, but these manuscripts are either lost or yet to be found.

Content

First chapter
In the first chapter of the Kausitaki Upanishad, rebirth and transmigration of Atman (Self) is asserted as existent, and that one's life is affected by karma, and then it asks whether there is liberation and freedom from the cycles of birth and rebirth. Verse 2 of the first chapter states it as follows (abridged),

In verse 6 of chapter 1, the Kausitaki Upanishad asserts that a man is the season (nature), sprouts from season, rises from a cradle, reborn through his wife, as splendour. It then states, in a dialogue between Man and Brahman (Universal Self, Eternal Reality),

Edward Cowell translates the above verses that declare the "Oneness in Atman and Brahman" principle as follows,

Second chapter
In the second chapter of the Kausitaki Upanishad, each life and all lives is declared as Brahman (Universal Self, Eternal Being). To the extent a person realizes that his being is identical with Brahman , to that extent he is Brahman. He doesn't need to pray, states Kausitaki Upanishad, the one who realizes and understands his true nature as identical with the universe, the Brahman. To those who don't understand their Atman, they blindly serve their senses and cravings, they worship the without; and in contrast, those who do understand their Atman, their senses serve their Atman, they live holistically.

In verse 5 of the second chapter, the Kausitaki Upanishad asserts that "external rituals such as Agnihotram offered in the morning and in the evening, must be replaced with inner Agnihotram, the ritual of introspection". Paul Deussen states that this chapter reformulates religion, by declaring, "religion is supposed not to consist in the observance of the external cult; but that which places the whole life, with every breathe, in its service." It is knowledge that makes one the most beautiful, the most glorious, and the strongest. Not rituals, but knowledge should be one's pursuit.

Third chapter
After asserting Atman (Self) as personified God in first two chapters, the Kausitaki Upanishad develops the philosophical doctrine of the Atman in the third chapter. It identifies perception of sense-objects as dependent on sense-organs, which in turn depend on integrative psychological powers of the mind. Then it posits that freedom and liberation comes not from sense-objects, not from sense-organs, not from subjective psychological powers of mind, but that it comes from "knowledge and action" alone. The one who knows Self, and acts harmoniously with the Self, solemnly exists as the highest God which is that Self (Atman) itself. The chapter invokes deity Indra, personifies him as Atman and reveals him as communicating that he is Life-breath and Atman, and Atman is him and all is One.

The chapter presents the metaphysical definition of a human being as Consciousness, Atman, Self. In verse 3, it develops the foundation for this definition by explaining that speech cannot define a human being, because we see human beings midst us who are born without the power of speech (dumb); that sight cannot define a human being, because we see human beings midst us who are born without the ability of sight (blind); that hearing cannot define a human being, because we see human beings midst us who are born without the ability to hear (deaf); that mind cannot define a human being, because we see human beings midst us who are without the power of clear thinking (foolishness); that arms or legs cannot define a human being, because we see human beings midst us who lose their arms or legs (cut in an accident). A being has life-force, which is consciousness. And that which is conscious, has life-force.

In many verses of chapter 3, the theme, the proof and the premise is re-asserted by Kaushitaki Upanishad, that "Prana is prajna, Prajna is prana" (वै प्राणः सा प्रज्ञा या वा प्रज्ञा स प्राणः, Life-force is consciousness, consciousness is life-force).

In the last verses of chapter 3, the Kaushitaki Upanishad asserts that to really know someone, one must know his Self. Know the Self of the subject, not just superficial objects. The structure of its argument is as follows (abridged),

Edward Cowell translates these last verses as, "Prana is prajna, it is joy, it is eternally young, it is immortal. This is the guardian of the world, this is the king of the world, this is the lord of the world, this is my Self. Thus let a man know, thus let a man know." Robert Hume summarizes the last verse of Kaushitaki's Chapter 3 as stating that "a human being's ethical responsibility, his very self being is identical with the world-all".

Fourth chapter
The fourth chapter of Kausitaki Upanishad builds on the third chapter, but it peculiarly varies in various manuscripts of Rig veda discovered in Indian subcontinent. This suggests that this chapter may be an addition of a later era. Despite the variations, the central idea is similar in all recensions so far. The chapter offers sixteen themes in explaining what Brahman (Atman) is, which overlaps with the twelve found in Chapter 2 of Brihadaranyaka Upanishad. This last chapter of Kausitaki Upanishad states that Brahman and Self are one, there is ultimate unity in the Self, which is the creative, pervasive, supreme and universal in each living being.

Translations
The Kaushitaki Upanishad has been translated by many scholars, but the translations vary because the manuscripts used vary. It was translated into Persian in medieval times, as Kokhenk; however, the manuscript used for that translation has been lost. The most cited English translations are those by Eduard Cowell, Paul Deussen, Robert Hume and Max Muller.

References

External links

Kaushitaki Upanishad Robert Hume (Translator), Oxford University Press (1921)
Kaushitaki Upanishad Max Muller (Translator), Oxford University Press
Kaushitaki Upanishad Edward Cowell (Translator), Sanskrit version is in pages 1–144, Cowell's English translation begins page 145 onwards.
Sri Aurobindo, The Upanishads Upanishads. Sri Aurobindo Ashram, Pondicherry. 1972.
 

Upanishads